Russell Begaye is a Navajo politician who served as the 8th president of Navajo Nation from May 2015 to January 2019. He was the second New Mexican Navajo to hold the Navajo Presidency.

Early life and education 
Born in Shiprock, New Mexico, Begaye graduated from the University of California, Los Angeles (UCLA) in 1974 with a degree in political science. In 1977, Begaye received his Master of Divinity degree from the Southwestern Baptist Theological Seminary in Fort Worth, Texas.

Career 
From 1977 to 2011, Begaye worked for the North American Mission Board. Begaye served on the Navajo Nation Council from 2011 until his election as President of the Navajo Nation on April 4, 2015. Begaye was sworn into office on May 12, 2015 and served until January 8, 2019, when he was succeeded by Vice President Jonathan Nez.

Begaye is currently a candidate for Navajo Nation Council (Shiprock) in the 2022 election. Begaye lost his election to incumbent Eugenia Charles-Newton.

Personal life 
Begaye was married to Kyoon Chung Begaye, a dentist in Atlanta metropolitan area. Due to the absence of Kyoon Chung Begaye in Navajo Nation affairs, the wife of Vice President Jonathan Nez took on the informal duties of First Lady of the Navajo Nation. In 2016, Begaye stated that his seventeen year-long marriage with Kyoon Chung Begaye was over. Begaye is not a native speaker of Navajo.

References

Living people
21st-century Native Americans
New Mexico Democrats
People from Shiprock, New Mexico
People from Window Rock, Arizona
Presidents of the Navajo Nation
University of California, Los Angeles alumni
Year of birth missing (living people)